The spruce carpet (Thera britannica) is a moth in the family Geometridae. The species was first described by Alfred Jefferis Turner in 1925. It is a double-brooded species, meaning it has two broods in one year. Its wings are coloured with different shades of grey, but the spring brood tends to have more brown colours.

Distribution
Found from the British Isles and France through central Europe to the north of the Carpathian Mountains. In the north to the south of Scandinavia. In the south there are isolated occurrences in the Pyrenees, in Corsica, on the Italian peninsula, in the Carpathians and in the mountains of Greece (including Peloponnese) as well as in Bulgaria. The species is more common than in the southern areas in the northern regions of the Alps. Outside of Europe, there are confirmed reports from the north-west and north-east of Turkey, Transcaucasia and the Caucasus.

Description
Very similar to grey pine carpet, but is usually more richly marked and greyer in appearance. The ground colour of the forewing varies between light grey to blackish grey. Within the median band there are individual dark brown reddish-brown stains (shapes) which are often marked with a white border. Three or more of these shapes are ovoid areas located towards the trailing edge. The median band is fluted and normally edged narrowly with white. The sub-terminal line is generally well marked. The spring brood is an overall brown rather than grey. Important differential characters are the white marginal line to central band, the distinct sub-terminal line and the dark grey-brown hindwings. It closely resembles Thera obeliscata See Townsend et al.

Similar species
Itself variable Thera britannica closely resembles some forms of  Thera obeliscata In case of doubt, specialists should be consulted for determination.

Biology
Its flight periods are April to late June (spring brood) and from the end of August to mid-October (autumn brood).
The larva feeds on Picea abies and Pseudotsuga menziesii.

References

External links

Spruce carpet at UKMoths
Butterflies and Moths of Northern Ireland
Lepiforum e.V.
Difficult Species Guide

Cidariini
Moths of Europe
Moths of Asia
Taxa named by Alfred Jefferis Turner
Moths described in 1925